Pindis is a genus of satyrid butterflies found in the Neotropical realm.

Species
Listed alphabetically:
Pindis squamistriga R. Felder, 1869
Pindis pellonia (Godman, [1901])

References

Euptychiina
Nymphalidae of South America
Butterfly genera
Taxa named by Rudolf Felder